Degerloch is one of the stadtbezirke, or city districts, of Stuttgart in Baden-Württemberg, Germany. Degerloch was founded 1956 by fusing the former municipality with the same name (i.e., Degerloch) and the former district of Hoffeld. Degerloch is a traditional wine-growing area (mainly Trollinger). Degerloch is connected by the Stuttgart Rack Railway to the city of Stuttgart. Its population is 16,527 (2020).

References

Districts of Stuttgart